River Town Saints is a Canadian country music group from Arnprior, Ontario, composed of Chris McComb, Jeremy Bortot, Jordan Potvin, Chase Kasner, and Joey Patrois. Labelle, McComb and Bortot formed the trio Labelle in 2014, later adding Potvin and Daniel DiGiacomo and changing their name to River Town Saints. On February 21, 2019, DiGiacomo died unexpectedly at the age of 31. Afterwards, the band added Chase Kasner. Patrois initially filled in on bass before joining the band officially a short while later. The group began playing shows around their hometown in 2014. They signed to Open Road Recordings in July 2015 and released their debut single, "A Little Bit Goes a Long Way", in November of that same year. The song debuted on the Billboard Canada Country chart in January 2016, eventually peaking at #31. A music video, filmed in Ottawa, premiered on CMT the following month. Their follow up single, "Cherry Bomb", released May 6 of 2016, saw greater success, peaking at #24 on the Billboard Canadian Country Charts. The band released their third single "Bonfire" in January 2017, and it was their first song to debut on the Canadian Country Top 40, coming in at #39 its first week on radio. It went on to become the band's first Top 10 hit in April 2017, peaking at #9.

In 2016 the band was nominated for the CCMA award in the Rising Star category. Their album River Town Saints was released on June 9, 2017.

In 2019 their lead singer Chris Labelle left the band to pursue a solo career, and the band's bass player, Dan Di Giacomo, died unexpectedly.  The band reformed with a new lead singer, Chase Kasner, and a new bass player, Joe Patrois.

Discography

Studio albums

Singles

Music videos

Awards and nominations

References

External links

Canadian country music groups
Musical groups established in 2013
Musical groups from Ottawa
Musical quintets
Open Road Recordings artists
2013 establishments in Ontario